Hugo Midón (February 27, 1944 – March 25, 2011) was an Argentine children's literature writer, theater director and actor. He graduated from the Theatre Institute of the University of Buenos Aires. Among the plays he staged were Cantando sobre la mesa, El imaginario, Narices and El gato con botas. Midón won numerous awards during his career, including the Premio de la Asociación de Cronistas del Espectáculo and the Premio Nacional del Teatro.

References

External links

1944 births
2011 deaths
Argentine children's writers
Argentine theatre directors
Argentine male actors
Burials at La Chacarita Cemetery